Pyramid (stylized as Pyr△mid) is the third album by progressive rock band The Alan Parsons Project, released in 1978. It is a concept album centred on the pyramids of Giza. At the time the album was conceived, interest in pyramid power and Tutankhamun was widespread in the US and the UK. Pyramid was nominated for the 1978 Grammy Award for Best Engineered Album, Non-Classical.
  
The book visible in the cover design is G. Patrick Flanagan – Pyramid Power: The Millennium Science (1973).

Track listing
All songs written and composed by Alan Parsons and Eric Woolfson.

Bonus tracks
Pyramid was remastered and reissued in 2008 with the following bonus tracks:

"Voyager/What Goes Up/The Eagle Will Rise Again" (instrumental) – 8:55
"What Goes Up/Little Voice" (early version demo) – 4:07
"Can't Take It with You" (early version demo) – 1:45
"Hyper-Gamma-Spaces" (demo) – 2:21
"The Eagle Will Rise Again" (alternate version – backing track) – 3:20
"In the Lap of the Gods" (Part I – demo) – 3:14
"In the Lap of the Gods" (Part II – backing track rough mix) – 1:56

Bonus tracks details
What Goes Up/Little Voice – Another song called, at the time, Little Voice was included in this demo but was not used in the final album. 
Can't Take It With You (early version demo) – Alan Parsons (unusually) played all the instruments.  
Hyper-Gamma Spaces – The name came from Eric Woolfson's brother Richard, whose Mathematics Doctorial Thesis carried the title Hyper-Gamma Spaces.
The Eagle Will Rise Again (alternative version-backing track) – Intended as a Reprise Rock Band version demo attempt. This was abandoned as there was already enough material for the album.

Personnel 

David Paton – bass, vocals
Stuart Elliott – drums, percussion
Ian Bairnson – electric and acoustic guitars
Eric Woolfson, Duncan Mackay – keyboards 
Dean Ford, Colin Blunstone, Lenny Zakatek, John Miles, Jack Harris – vocals
Phil Kenzie – saxophone solos on "One More River"
Choir: The English Chorale, Choirmaster: Bob Howes
Produced and engineered by Alan Parsons
Executive production: Eric Woolfson
Arrangements: Andrew Powell
Album cover design: Hipgnosis
Mastering: Chris Blair

Charts

Weekly charts

Year-end charts

Certifications and sales

!scope="row"|Worldwide
|
|2,000,000+
|-

References

Pyramid, Alan Parsons Project. Arista Records AB 4180, 1978 (Vinyl LP)

The Alan Parsons Project albums
Concept albums
1978 albums
Albums with cover art by Hipgnosis
Arista Records albums
Albums produced by Alan Parsons